Minimalist shoes are shoes intended to closely approximate barefoot running or walking conditions in comparison to traditional shoes. Minimalist shoes are defined as providing "minimal interference with the natural movement of the foot, because of its high flexibility, low heel to toe drop, weight and stack height, and the absence of motion control and stability devices." Minimalist shoes provide more sensory contact for the foot on the ground while simultaneously providing the feet with some protection from ground hazards and conditions (such as pebbles and dirt). Research shows that wearing a minimalist shoe can help improve running economy, foot strength and arch function.

Types 
A 2018 paper defines "minimalist footwear as a shoe with a highly flexible sole and upper that weighs 200g or less, has a heel stack height of 20mm or less and a heel-toe differential of 7mm or less."

Generally, there are two types of minimalist shoes:
 Barefoot Running Shoes are characterized by their zero drop from heel to toe, no arch support, minimal cushioning at the heel, and a very thin sole of around 3-10mm. Also, the toe box is considerably wider to provide more space to the toes, whereby they slightly resemble the shape of ducks' feet, when viewed from above and compared to traditional shoes. Few product lines fall into this category. Examples include the Vibram FiveFingers and Merrell Glove, which use an outsole produced by Vibram, or the Xero Prio.
 Minimalist Running Shoes are in between traditional running shoes and barefoot running shoes. They have a reduced heel-to-toe drop of about 4–8 mm, reduced cushioning and reduced or no arch support. The toe box is usually in-between barefoot and traditional running shoes.

In recognition of the barefoot running movement, major companies also started producing shoes targeted at this customer segment. However, these shoes do not usually meet the requirement of a minimal or barefoot shoe. Examples include:
 The Nike Free, which has a 17 mm heel and is marketed as minimalist running shoe, though this designation is disputed by some.
 The Adidas Adizero line, which has a heel-to-toe drop of 4 to 10mm, a total heel height of up to 30mm and a comparatively traditional, narrow toe box.
 The Champion Alpha.
In contrast to barefoot and minimal shoes, one of the marketing terms repeatedly employed for this product segment is natural running.

Effects
Although running injuries are more common during the first period after adopting minimalist footwear, there is a lack of evidence about the long-term injury potential of minimalist shoes compared to standard ones.

A 2022 review found that minimalist shoes increase the size and strength of the foot muscles in healthy individuals.

A 2020 systematic review found that "minimalist shoes can improve running economy and build the cross-sectional area and stiffness of Achilles tendon but also induce greater loading of the ankle and metatarsophalangeal joint" compared to non-minimalist shoes.

See also 
Huarache (running shoe)
Vibram FiveFingers
Vivobarefoot
Xero Shoes

References 

Athletic shoes
Sports footwear
20th-century fashion
Minimalist clothing